Leppävesi is the 65th (63.59 km²) largest lake of Finland in municipalities Jyväskylä, Laukaa and Toivakka. It is quite narrow but long lake in direction south-north. It flows to Päijänne via Vaajavirta. It is part of Keitele Canal, waterway connecting Lake Keitele and Päijänne. National road 9 and Pieksämäki–Jyväskylä railway cross the lake.

References

 Leppävesi in Kalapaikka.net

See also
 List of lakes in Finland
 

Landforms of Central Finland
Toivakka
Lakes of Laukaa
Lakes of Jyväskylä